Thief in the Night is the nineteenth studio album by American keyboardist and record producer George Duke. It was released in 1985 through Elektra Records, making it his first release on the label. Recording sessions for the album took place at Le Gonks West in West Hollywood, California. Duke played various keyboard instruments on the album, including Synclavier II, Memorymoog, Fender Rhodes, Sequential Circuits Prophet-5, clavinet, Yamaha P F15 and Minimoog. The album features contributions from Lynn Davis, Paul Jackson Jr, Paulinho da Costa, Robert Brookins and Deniece Williams among others.

The album peaked at number 183 on the Billboard 200 and number 52 on Top R&B/Hip-Hop Albums chart. Its lead single, a title track "Thief in the Night", reached number 37 on the Hot R&B/Hip-Hop Songs, number 21 on the Dance Club Songs, and number 89 in the UK Singles Chart. Its second single "I Surrender" and a promotional single "Love Mission" did not chart.

Track listing

Personnel 
 George Duke – vocals (tracks: 1, 5), lead vocals (tracks: 2-4, 6, 9), backing vocals (tracks: 2-4, 6-8), Fender Rhodes (tracks: 1, 3, 4), Synclavier II (tracks: 1, 3, 6-8), bass synthesizer (tracks: 2, 3), organ & piccolo flute (track 2), Prophet-5 (tracks: 4, 9), Memorymoog (tracks: 4, 5, 7), clavinet (tracks: 4-6, 8), effects (track 5), minimoog & bass (track 6), Yamaha P F15 (track 9), drums (tracks: 2, 3, 5-7, 9), producer

 John Fiore – lead vocals (track 8)
 Lynn Blythe Davis – backing vocals (tracks: 2-4, 6, 9)
 Carl Carwell – backing vocals (tracks: 3, 4, 6, 9)
 Lena Sunday – backing vocals (tracks: 2, 3, 6)
 Robert Brookins – backing vocals (tracks: 3, 4)
 Deniece Williams – backing vocals (track: 6, 9)
 Alice Murrell – backing vocals (track 3)
 Petsey Powell – backing vocals (track 4)
 Shirley Jones – backing vocals (track 7)
 Howard Hewett – backing vocals (track 9)
 Paul Jackson Jr. – guitar (tracks: 1-6, 8-9)
 Charles Fearing – guitar (track 4)
 Charles T. "Chuck" Gentry – guitar (track 7)
 Louis Johnson – bass (tracks: 1, 4)
 Steve Ferrone – drums (tracks: 1, 4, 8)
 John Robinson – tom-tom drum (track 5)
 Paulo Roberto da Costa – percussion (tracks: 1, 2, 6, 7, 9), backing vocals (track 9)
 Richard David Lawson – percussion (track 3)
 Mick Guzauski – effects (tracks: 2, 5, 7), engineering
 Steve Schmidt – assistant engineering
 Mitch Gibson – assistant engineering
 Rick Clifford – assistant engineering
 Erik Zobler – assistant engineering
 Tommy Vicari – mixing
 Brian Gardner – mastering
 Carol Friedman – art direction & photography
 JoDee Stringham – design
 Chris Callis – photography
 Jay Vigon – cover
 Richard Seireeni – cover

Chart history

References

External links 

George Duke's 1980s discography on his website
Thief In the Night on iTunes

1985 albums
George Duke albums
Elektra Records albums
Albums produced by George Duke